The German Church in Liverpool is in Bedford Street South/ Canning Street and is part of the German speaking churches of North England.

The North of England German Protestant churches are members of the "Synod of German-speaking Lutheran, Reformed and United Congregations in Great Britain" and come under the care of the overseas department of the EKD (Evangelical Church in Germany).
Services in German are held twice a month on the first (4:00 pm) and third Sundays (11:00 am).

Regular Groups include a Faith discussion group, Wirral Circle and a Toddler Play Group.

Origins 
An English cleric from the Church of England (Anglican Communion) came across a prayer meeting of some Germans in a disused ship on the River Mersey, a man was ordained and ministered to this congregation. Initially it was a German-speaking congregation in the Church of England, later to become affiliated with the  Evangelical Lutheran church.

This is the origin of the German Evangelical Lutheran (E.K.D.) congregation in Liverpool. After using many different buildings for worship and education, it built its own structure in 1960.

See also
Religion in the United Kingdom

References

External links

 https://deutschekirche.org.uk/liverpool-en
 https://facebook.com/deutschekircheliverpool
 https://archive.org/details/geschichtederde01rosegoog
 https://web.archive.org/web/20091211012303/http://www.liverpool.gov.uk/Images/tcm21-32263.pdf
 http://deutschekirche.org.uk/
 https://web.archive.org/web/20060517064455/http://lutheran.org.uk/history-more.htm

Churches in Liverpool
German-speaking religious communities abroad